The 1917 Virginia gubernatorial election was held on November 6, 1917 to elect the governor of Virginia.

Results

References

1917
Virginia
gubernatorial
November 1917 events